The Schumacher Menace is a radio-controlled car made by Schumacher Racing Products powered by a nitro fuel engine.

The Schumacher Menace is a four wheel drive stadium truck. It is the world's fastest 1:10 ready to run stadium truck as of 2005.

There is an on-road version of the Schumacher Menace called the Schumacher Menace GTR.

Specifications

 Type: 1:10 stadium truck, 4WD
 Engine: 0.21 in³ (3.4 cm³) with E-start
 Power: 2.1 horsepower (1.6 kW) at 38,000 rpm
 Maximum engine speed: 40,000 rpm
 Gearbox: Three gears, fixed, automatic
 Chassis: 3.0 mm aluminium (anodized)
 Fuel tank: 0.125 L

Schumacher Racing Products